Joyce Bonwick  née Brewer (born 22 March 1915 in Cordalba, Queensland - died 26 June 2011 in Brisbane, Queensland) was an Australian cricket player. She played two test matches for the Australia national women's cricket team.

Brewer was the twelfth woman to play Test cricket for Australia.

Brewer was awarded the Australian Sports Medal on 30 November 2000 for her contributions to sports administration.

References

1915 births
2011 deaths
Australia women Test cricketers